The Falcon in Mexico is a 1944 film directed by William Berke and stars Tom Conway in his recurring role as a suave amateur sleuth, supported by Mona Maris and Martha Vickers. Conway would play the Falcon seven more times before RKO retired the franchise in 1946.The Falcon in Mexico was the ninth of 16 films in the Falcon detective series. The film features many second unit sequences filmed in Mexico and Brazil; the latter scenes from Orson Welles's aborted film It's All True.

Plot
Tom Lawrence (Tom Conway), aka the Falcon, helps Dolores Ybarra (Cecilia Callejo) enter an art gallery late at night to supposedly recover a painting that belongs to her. The Falcon discovers that the woman is the model for the artist's painting, however, the artist, Humphrey Wade (Bryant Washburn) has been dead for 15 years. The body of the owner of the gallery lies murdered on the floor. When the security guards arrive, alerted by a burglar alarm, they try to arrest Tom but he escapes with the painting and goes to the home of Winthrop "Lucky Diamond" Hughes (Emory Parnell), a collector of Wade's work.

Wanted by the American police for murder, the Falcon finds Barbara (Martha Vickers), the late artist's daughter and they travel to Mexico City. At the airport, Barbara is met by a car from the La Casa Del Laga Inn and slips away. After she drives away, Tom hires taxi driver Manuel Romero (Nestor Paiva) and his son, Pancho (Fernando Alvarado) to follow her.

The La Casa Del Laga Inn, located in a country village was where her father lived and worked. Barbara introduces Tom to her stepmother Raquel (Mona Maris), a dancer, and Raquel's partner and new husband Anton (Joseph Vitale) who warns Tom to leave Barbara alone and get out of Mexico.

At the inn, desk clerk Paula Dudley (Mary Currier), shows the Wade studio, where Tom finds a drawing done in Wade's style, with its paint still wet. Dolores, searching for her portrait in Tom's room, is surprised by his early return but when he pursues her into the hallway, she make her getaway. When he returns to his room, an unknown assailant knocks him unconscious and steals the painting.

Don Carlos Ybarra (Pedro de Cordoba), searches for his daughter but when her body turns up drowned in the lake, Tom thinks she has been murdered. Hughes arrives at the hotel without his famous diamond ring, a piece of jewellery he always wears. At dinner, Barbara collapses, the victim of poisoning, leaving Tom with a puzzling mystery that may be linked to the disappearance of Humphrey Wade. If Wade is still alive, who stands to gain from that?

At the lake, Tom finds Paula, dead in a boat. Manuel appears and reveals that he is an undercover Mexican police officer, who also needs to find the killer on the loose. Back at the inn, they discover Barbara is missing and on her way to an island, where her father's grave is located. When Tom removes the headstone, however, a masked man approaches Barbara and reveals himself to be her father. He explains that his disappearance came about when his alleged suicide made his paintings valuable.

As Wade warns Barbara that their lives are in danger, he is shot dead. Tom deduces that the killer must be Hughes, and he sets a trap for him. Wearing Wade's disguise, Tom walks onto the plaza and before Hughes can shoot from a balcony, Manuel fires. With the killer brought to justice, Tom bids farewell to his Mexican friends and boards an aircraft bound for home.

Cast

 Tom Conway as Tom Lawrence  
 Mona Maris as Raquel  
 Martha Vickers as Barbara Wade 
 Bryant Washburn as Humphrey Wade, artist
 Nestor Paiva as Manuel Romero
 Fernando Alvarado as Pancho Romero 
 Joseph Vitale as Anton 
 Mary Currier as Paula Dudley  
 Cecilia Callejo as Dolores Ybarra  
 Emory Parnell as James Winthrop "Lucky Diamond" Hughes  
 Pedro de Cordoba as Don Carlos Ybarra  
 George Lewis as Mexican detective
 Julian Rivero as Mexican doctor
 Juanita Alvarez as Singer
 Ruth Alvarez as Singer
 Alan Ward as Ajax policeman
 Sherry Hall as Ajax policeman
 Wheaton Chambers as Jarvis
 Chester Carlisle as Grenville
 Bert Moorhouse as Detective Marks
 Frank Mayo as Inspector O'Shea
 Frank O'Connor as Police officer
 Greta Christensen as Isabel
 Nina Campana as Duenna
 Chiche Baru as Senorita
 Lorraine Rivero as Headwaitress
 Iris Bynam as Maid
 Dorothy Olivero as Maid
 Theodore Rand as Dance specialty
 Geneva Hall as Dance specialty

Production
Principal photography on "The Falcon in Mexico" took place from mid-March to April 4, 1944.

Reception
At the time of its release, The Falcon in Mexico earned high critical marks, with Boxoffice declaring it, "... one of the best of the tried-and-true whodunit series." In a recent review of the Falcon series for the Time Out Film Guide, Tom Milne wrote, "Conway, bringing a lighter touch to the series (which managed its comic relief better than most), starred in nine films after The Falcon's Brother, most of them deft and surprisingly enjoyable."

See also
List of American films of 1944

References

Notes

Citations

Bibliography

 Jewell, Richard and Vernon Harbin. The RKO Story. New Rochelle, New York: Arlington House, 1982. .
 Pitts, Michael R. RKO Radio Pictures Horror, Science Fiction and Fantasy Films, 1929-1956 McFarland, 3 Apr. 2015
 Pym, John, ed. Time Out Film Guide. London: Time Out Guides Limited, 2004. .

External list
 
 The Falcon in Mexico profile, imdb.com; accessed March 10, 2014.
 
 

1944 films
RKO Pictures films
1944 crime drama films
American black-and-white films
Films directed by William A. Berke
Films scored by Leigh Harline
Films set in Mexico
Films shot in Brazil
Films shot in Mexico
American crime drama films
The Falcon (film character) films
1940s English-language films
1940s American films